Octava was a city and bishopric in Numidia. It is a Roman Catholic titular see.

History 
Giru Marcelli, located in present Algeria, was among the many town in the Roman province of Numidia which were important enough to become a suffragan diocese in the papal sway, but faded completely during the 6th century advent of Islam.

Its only historically documented bishops were :
 Victor, partaking in a council held in 256 at Carthage by its bishop Saint Cyprianus on the 'lapsed Christians' who accepted forced pagan sacrificing to avoid martyrdom.
 Pascentius, who participated in the synod called at Carthage by Hunerik of the Vandal Kingdom in 484, whereafter he was exiled, like most Catholic incumbents, unlike their Donatist heretic counterparts.

Titular see 
The diocese was nominally restored in 1933 as Titular bishopric of Octava (Latin) / Ottava (Curiate Italian) / Octaven(sis) (Latin) (Latin adjective).

It has had the following incumbents, of the fitting Episcopal (lowest) rank, with archiepiscopal exceptions :
Titular Archbishop: Emile Maurice Guerry (1966.02.15 – death 1969.03.11) as emeritate; previously Titular Archbishop of Acrida (1940.05.31 – 1952.12.02) as [[Coadjutor Archbishop of Cambrai (France) (1940.05.31 – 1952.12.02), succeeding as Metropolitan Archbishop of Cambrai (1952.12.02 – 1966.02.15)
 Ignazio Cannavò (1970.10.31 – 1977.06.03), first as Auxiliary Bishop of Diocese of Acireale (Italy) (1970.10.31 – 1976.02.21), then as Coadjutor Archbishop of Messina (Sicily, Italy) (1976.02.21 – 1977.06.03); later Bishop-Prelate of Territorial Prelature of Santa Lucia del Mela (Italy) (1976.12.20 – 1986.09.30), Metropolitan Archbishop of Messina (Italy) (1977.06.03 – 1986.09.30) and (Archbishop-)Bishop of Lipari (Italy) (1977.12.10 – 1986.09.30), Metropolitan Archbishop of Messina-Lipari-Santa Lucia del Mela (Italy) (1986.09.30 – retired 1997.05.17), died 2015
Titular Archbishop: Blasco Francisco Collaço (born colonial India) (1977.09.23 – ...) as papal diplomat : Apostolic Nuncio (ambassador) to Panama (1977.09.23 – 1982.07.26), Apostolic Nuncio to Dominican Republic (1982.07.26 – 1991.02.28), Apostolic Delegate to Puerto Rico (1982.07.26 – 1991.02.28), Apostolic Pro-Nuncio to Madagascar (1991.02.28 – 1996.04.13), Apostolic Pro-Nuncio to Mauritius (1991.02.28 – 1996.04.13), Apostolic Nuncio to Seychelles (1994.05.14 – 1996.04.13), Apostolic Nuncio to Bulgaria (1996.04.13 – 2000.05.24), Apostolic Nuncio to Namibia (2000.05.24 – 2006.08.17), Apostolic Nuncio to South Africa (2000.05.24 – 2006.08.17), Apostolic Delegate to Botswana (2000.05.24 – 2006.08.17), Apostolic Nuncio to Lesotho (2000.06.24 – 2006.08.17), Apostolic Nuncio to Swaziland (2000.06.24 – 2006.08.17), and on emeritate (2006.08.17 - ...).

See also 
 List of Catholic dioceses in Algeria

Sources and external links 
 GCatholic
 Bibliography
 Pius Bonifacius Gams, Series episcoporum Ecclesiae Catholicae, Leipzig 1931, p. 467
 Stefano Antonio Morcelli, Africa christiana, Volume I, Brescia 1816, p. 249

Catholic titular sees in Africa
Former Roman Catholic dioceses in Africa
Suppressed Roman Catholic dioceses